Alfred James McGuire (September 7, 1928 – January 26, 2001) was an American college basketball coach and broadcaster, the head coach at Marquette University from 1964 to 1977. He won a national championship in his final season at Marquette, and was inducted into the Naismith Memorial Basketball Hall of Fame in 1992. He was also well known as a longtime national television basketball broadcaster and for his colorful personality.

Early life
McGuire played three years of basketball at St. John's Prep, then located in Brooklyn, New York (graduated 1947), and went on to star at St. John's University (1947–1951), where he played for four years and captained the 1951 team that posted a  mark and finished third in the NIT.

NBA career
After college, McGuire played in the NBA, with his hometown New York Knicks for three seasons, 1951–54. While with the Knicks, he once famously pleaded with his coach for playing time, with this guarantee: "I can stop Cousy." Inserted into the lineup, McGuire then proceeded to foul the Celtics star on his next six trips down the court.

On September 17, 1954, the Knicks traded McGuire and Connie Simmons to the Baltimore Bullets for Ray Felix and Chuck Grigsby. McGuire rode the bench for the Bullets, playing just 98 minutes in ten games and scoring 23 points; actually, the record books don't even credit McGuire for those numbers. In late November, the NBA revoked the franchise of the 3–11 (and bankrupt) Bullets, and decided to wipe Baltimore's games away as if they had never been played, along with all individual statistics. Several ex-Bullets (including All-Star Frank Selvy) hooked on with other NBA teams, but McGuire (who had been sidelined by a leg injury) did not, ending his playing career.

Coaching career
McGuire began his coaching career as an assistant at Dartmouth College (1955–1957) for head coach Doggie Julian. McGuire coached the freshman team at Dartmouth. One of his players was Dave Gavitt. McGuire then took his first head coaching job at Belmont Abbey College (1957–1964), in Belmont, North Carolina, where he recruited many high school players off the streets of New York.

McGuire became head coach at Marquette University in Milwaukee in 1964 where he enjoyed success, including the NIT Championship in 1970 and a Final Four appearance in 1974 against the eventual champion North Carolina State Wolfpack.

With assistant coaches Hank Raymonds (who would succeed him) and Rick Majerus, who became a successful college head coach, McGuire led Marquette to its only NCAA basketball championship in 1977, his final season as a head coach. McGuire's Marquette team, led by Alfred "Butch" Lee, Maurice "Bo" Ellis and Jerome Whitehead, defeated Dean Smith's North Carolina Tar Heels for the title, two days after Whitehead received a full-court pass and subsequently made a last-second shot, propelling Marquette past UNC Charlotte in the national semifinals. Ranked sixteenth, Marquette had seven losses going into the NCAA tournament, the most losses up to that time for a team that would win the NCAA Championship. The thrilling weekend in Atlanta's Omni Coliseum provided a happy sendoff.

While at Marquette, McGuire founded "Al's Run," a charity event for the Children's Hospital of Wisconsin. The race celebrated its 40th anniversary in 2017.

Business career
On December 17, 1976, McGuire stunned fans by announcing that he would retire as coach after the end of the current season, to become vice chairman of Medalist Industries, effective May 1, 1977; he had served on its board of directors of the sporting goods firm for six years. McGuire was an executive with the company less than a year, resigning on March 20, 1978.

Broadcasting career

After coaching, McGuire became a popular commentator for NBC Sports and CBS Sports. McGuire's on-air banter with colleague Billy Packer helped increase the popularity of college basketball across the United States. McGuire was courtside for the landmark 1979 championship game between Indiana State and Michigan State that pitted Larry Bird and Magic Johnson, which is remembered as a game that vastly enhanced the appeal of college basketball. Reflecting on the event ten years later, McGuire said that the 1979 title game in Salt Lake City "put college basketball on its afterburner." That national championship game remains the highest-rated NCAA Final broadcast.

Pine Bluff Incident 

On February 12 1984, McGuire was broadcasting the Arkansas Razorbacks upset victory over the undefeated and #1 ranked North Carolina Tar Heels led by Michael Jordan. As time expired, the Tar Heels missed the game winning shot, losing their first game of the season. However, McGuire inexplicably shouted “It’s Good!” while the shot was in the air. After the shot was missed, McGuire was embarrassed and silent, even though the huge upset moment warranted excitement and words from the broadcast team. Arkansas fans to this day showcase this blatant display of biased broadcasting as evidence that the world is against them.

Death
After a long bout with leukemia, McGuire died at age 72 in 2001 in Brookfield, Wisconsin.

Legacy
The Al McGuire Center, which includes a statue in his honor, opened on the Marquette campus in 2004.

He was elected to the Wisconsin Athletic Hall of Fame in 1993.

McGuire's brother Dick (Naismith Memorial Basketball Hall of Fame inductee 1993) was also a prominent figure in basketball, having starred at St. John's and then with the New York Knicks of the NBA. Dick and Al both played for the Knicks. They are the only pair of brothers, and one of only two sibling pairs (the other being Cheryl and Reggie Miller), inducted into the Naismith Memorial Basketball Hall of Fame.  Others in the Hall of Fame Class of '92 included Lou Carnesecca, Phil Woolpert, Jack Ramsay, Connie Hawkins, Bob Lanier, Sergei Belov, Nera D. White and Lusia Harris Steward. McGuire is not related to the late North Carolina and South Carolina coach Frank McGuire. Al and Frank coached against each other when Frank was head man at South Carolina. Al played for Frank at St. John's. Frank McGuire has been considered Al's coaching mentor.

In the state of Arkansas, McGuire is remembered infamously for the broadcasting debacle in Pine Bluff on February 12, 1984

McGuire was survived by his wife, Patricia, three children, sons Allie (who played for his father at Marquette) and Rob and daughter Noreen, and six grandchildren.

Play
Al McGuire's former television broadcast partner and friend, Dick Enberg, penned a one-man theatrical play entitled Coach portrayed by actor Cotter Smith.

It debuted at Marquette University's Helfaer Theater in 2005, and returned there by popular demand in 2006.  The play was then presented at the Alliance Theatre in Atlanta during the 2007 Final Four Championship, at Hofstra University in February 2008, and at the North Coast Repertory in San Diego County in April 2008. It returned to North Coast Rep by popular demand in August 2008, and subsequently was seen at Central Michigan University, Dick Enberg's alma mater on October 10, 2008. A benefit performance for the San Diego Chargers was presented on November 12, 2008. 
  
From January to June 2017, the play  entitled "McGuire" was presented by the Milwaukee Repertory Theater, starring Tony Award winner Anthony Crivello. That run broke all box office records for the space, playing to 'sold-out' houses in the 150 seat Stackner Cabaret. Crivello received critical praise for his work in the show, and won 2017 Wisconsin Footlights Award for "Outstanding Performance by a Leading Actor in a Play."

A five-minute presentation of the show was presented at the 2017 Wisconsin Sports Award on May 20, 2017, at the University Of Wisconsin Field House.
 
The audience included All-Pro Green Bay Packers QB Aaron Rodgers, All-Pro Green Bay Packers LT David Bahktieri and noted sports figures including  Green Bay Packers players Jason Spriggs, Kyle Murphy, former Packer player Mark Tauscher,  Milwaukee Brewers player Jonathan Villar,  Milwaukee Bucks player Jabari Parker, UW head women's basketball coach Jonathan Tsipis, former University of Wisconsin Milwaukee head men's basketball coach and current Butler head coach Lavall Jordan, Marquette University head men's basketball coach Steve Wojceichowski, UW head men's basketball coach Greg Gard, executives and broadcasters Bill "Rock" Schroeder, Steve "The Homer" True, Tim Van Vooren from ESPN, FOX Sports Wisconsin, Major League Baseball, Good Karma Broadcasting founder Milwaukee's ESPN Radio owner Craig Karmazin, top male and female athletes from Wisconsin, Marquette University, UW Green Bay, UW Milwaukee, Marquette University athletic director Bill Scholl, Wisconsin women's volleyball HOF 2017 athlete of the year Lauren Carlini,  Wisconsin men's basketball players including Zack Showalter, athletic director/ NCAA HOF former head football coach Barry Alvarez.

Four books have been written about McGuire's life. McGuire's biography "You Can Call Me Al: The Colorful Journey of College Basketball's Original Flower Child, Al McGuire," written by Chicago area author and journalist Joseph Declan Moran with McGuire's cooperation, was first published in March 1999 by Prairie Oak Press (Madison, WI); "I Remember Al McGuire: Personal Memories and Testimonials to College Basketball's Wittiest Coach and Commentator (as told by the people who knew him)," written by Mike Towle, was published in December 2001 by Cumberland House Publishing; "Cracked Sidewalks and French Pastry: The Wit and Wisdom of Al McGuire," written by Tom Kertscher, was published by University of Wisconsin Press in November 2002; "Al McGuire: The Colorful Warrior,"  written by Roger Jaynes, was published by Sports Publishing LLC in July 2004.

Coaching accomplishments
Belmont Abbey record: 109–64
Coached Belmont Abbey to five postseason appearances
Marquette record: 295–80
Coached team to 11 consecutive postseason bids at Marquette
NIT championship (1970)
Coached team to a 28–1 season (1971)
Associated Press, United Press International and United States Basketball Writers Association Coach of the Year (1971)
NABC Coach of the Year (1974)
NCAA championship (1977)
Among a select few coaches who have won both the NIT and NCAA championships
Marquette captured its only NCAA championship with a 67–59 victory over North Carolina in McGuire's last game as coach
More than 92 percent of his student-athletes completed requirements to earn their degrees from Marquette
Twenty-six of his players were drafted into the NBA
Marquette University athletic director (1973–77)
Conducted clinics at two Air Force bases in Europe (1971)

Head coaching record

Broadcasting experience
 College basketball analyst, NBC Sports and CBS Sports
 Basketball analyst, 1988 Olympic Games
 Color commentator for one NBA on NBC telecast in 1991
 Color commentator for CBS Sports' March Madness
 Perhaps his most famous line as a commentator came during the 1992 NCAA tournament at the Bradley Center in Milwaukee, when McGuire blurted out "Holy mackerel! Holy mackerel! Holy mackerel!" following a game-winning buzzer beater by Georgia Tech's James Forrest. The shot was the first three-pointer of Forrest's collegiate career in the first game McGuire broadcast for CBS.
 Following his broadcast of a 1996 NCAA Regional Championship, McGuire garnered fame for dancing with the players of Syracuse who were celebrating their entry into the Final Four. He would do the same the following year with the players from the University of Minnesota. The Minnesota players proclaimed they wanted to "Get down with Al!"
 McGuire's broadcasting career was capped by a warm and poignant reunion less than a year before his death. When Dick Enberg joined CBS Sports in 2000 after a long career with NBC, McGuire was able to be reunited with Enberg and longtime CBS commentator Billy Packer. On February 5, 2000, the trio called its final game together when Michigan State easily defeated UCONN 85–66. It was the first game the trio had called in nineteen year when Indiana defeated North Carolina for the 1981 NCAA National Championship game for NBC.

See also
 List of NCAA Division I Men's Final Four appearances by coach

References

1928 births
2001 deaths
American men's basketball coaches
American men's basketball players
Baltimore Bullets (1944–1954) players
Basketball coaches from New York (state)
Basketball players from New York City
Belmont Abbey Crusaders men's basketball coaches
College basketball announcers in the United States
College men's basketball head coaches in the United States
Dartmouth Big Green men's basketball coaches
Deaths from cancer in Wisconsin
Deaths from leukemia
Marquette Golden Eagles athletic directors
Marquette Golden Eagles men's basketball coaches
National Collegiate Basketball Hall of Fame inductees
Naismith Memorial Basketball Hall of Fame inductees
New York Knicks draft picks
New York Knicks players
Sportspeople from Brooklyn
St. John's Red Storm men's basketball players